Festivals Acadiens et Créoles is a three-day festival celebrating the music, crafts, and food of South Louisiana.  It is held annually in Lafayette, Louisiana.

History
Festivals Acadiens et Créoles formed from many other local events. The oldest single component of this cooperative is the Louisiana Native and Contemporary Crafts Festival (then named the Louisiana Native Crafts Festival), first presented October 28, 1972. CODOFIL started a Tribute to Cajun Music concert in 1974. In 1977, the Lafayette Convention and Visitors Commission merged the Tribute to Cajun Music and the Bayou food Festival.  Together, these events became known as the Festivals Acadiens.

A virtual festival was held in 2020.

References

Cajun culture
Festivals in Louisiana
Culture of Lafayette, Louisiana
Tourist attractions in Lafayette Parish, Louisiana
Cultural festivals in the United States
Louisiana Creole culture
French-American culture in Louisiana
Recurring events established in 1977
1977 establishments in Louisiana